Rate base is the value of property on which a public utility is permitted to earn a specified rate of return, in accordance with rules set by a regulatory agency. In general, the rate base consists of the value of property as used by the utility in providing service. It may be calculated by any one or a combination of accounting methods, such as fair value, prudent investment, reproduction cost, or original cost.

The rate base can include: cash, working capital, materials and supplies, deductions for accumulated provisions for depreciation, contributions in aid of construction, customer advances for construction, accumulated deferred income taxes, and accumulated deferred investment tax credits, all dependent on the method that is used in the calculation.

An emerging question facing utility regulators in some states is whether cloud computing software should be included in rate bases. Conventional software, in which a company purchases and installs the program on hardware that it own, generally is included, but most regulators do not allow a rate of return on cloud software.

Depreciation 

In a period of static costs or no inflation, an original cost valuation may be sufficient. With a period of inflation, a rate base which values plant and equipment at original cost substantially undervalues the plant. In these circumstances, utilities argue in favor of reproduction-cost valuations. In either case, depreciation on plant and equipment is subtracted from the rate base and carried as an operating expense. The theory behind including depreciation as an expense is that capital may be accumulated for further expansion and growth.

The utility's rate of return (a ratio of net operating income earned) is calculated as a percentage of its rate base.

References

Public utilities of the United States
Real estate valuation